WJMU (89.5 FM, "The Quad") is a radio station broadcasting an alternative music format. Licensed to Decatur, Illinois, United States, the station serves the Decatur area. The station is currently owned by Millikin University.

Current student personnel 
 Zach Harper – program director (since 2022), music director (since 2022), show host/producer
 Sam Thoong – production director (since 2022), show host/producer
 Eliz Hulick – promotion director (since 2022), show host/producer
 Anna Peter – sports director (since 2022), show host/producer
 Cole Anderson – news director (since 2022), show host/producer

Current faculty/community personnel
 Sam Meister – general manager, show host/producer
 Matt Sands – show host/producer
 Jeannie "Short Wheels" Martin – show host/producer
 Dr. Eduardo Cabrera – show host/producer
 Dr. Joel Blanco – show host/producer
 Dr. Scott Lambert – show host/producer
 Jamie Whitmer – show host/producer
 Frank Macaluso – producer

Notable past student personnel
 Greg Brown – program director, disc jockey (1971–1972); formerly with WLS-FM
 Dominique Bates-Smith – show host/producer (2017–2019); now with WSOY-AM
 Meghan Whitlock – promotions director (2018–2020), producer (2017–2020), show host (2017–2018, 2020); formerly with WAND-TV, now a freelance digital content manager for the PGA Tour
 Caleb Kelch – assistant music director (2019–2020), music director (2020–2021), show host/producer (2018–2021); now with WMBD-AM

Other past student personnel
 Lane Caspar – program director (2018–2020), news director (2018–2019), show host/producer (2017–2020)
 Frank Macaluso –  production director (2018–2020), creative projects director (2018–2020), producer (2017–2020, 2021), show host (2017–2019)
 Jason Messina – music director (2018–2020), head of training and technical management (2019–2020), show host/producer (2017–2020) 
 Sydney Stoewer – project coordinator (2018–2019), show host/producer (2018–2020)  
 Samuel Laro – program director (2021–2022), show host/producer (2018–2022), campus activities liaison (2019–2020), promotions director (2020–2021)
 Alex Saviano – show host/producer (2018–2022)
 Ronnie Ovando-Gomez – show host/producer (2018–2022)
 Molly McCool – show host/producer (2018–2020)
 Athena Pajer – news director (2020–2021), show host/producer (2018–2021)
 Aaron Pellican – sports color commentator (2018–2020), show host/producer (2018)
 Jordan Diver – sports director (2019–2020), program director (2020–2021), show host/producer (2019–2021)
 Madeline Bethard – news director (2019–2020), show host/producer (2019)
 Nicole Dadoly – production director (2020–2021), show host/producer (2019–2021)
 Nick Nemeth – sports director (2020-2022), sports color commentator (2018-2022), show host/producer (2019-2022)
 Faith Fitzsimmons – promotions director (2021-2022), show host/producer (2019-2022)
 Geoffrey Diver – show host/producer (2019–2021)
 Aidan Lee – production director (2021), music director (2021), show host/producer (2020-2021)
 Cole Daniel – production director (2022), music director (2022), show host/producer (since 2021–2022)

References

External links

JMU
JMU
Modern rock radio stations in the United States
Millikin University
Radio stations established in 1971